Bryan Gibson (born November 10, 1947 in Kentville, Nova Scotia) is a retired boxer from Canada, who represented his native country at the 1976 Summer Olympics, and is the first boxer of African descent from Nova Scotia to compete in the Olympics. There he was defeated in the first round of the men's middleweight division (– 75 kilograms) by East Germany's Bernd Wittenburg. He now coaches the Evangaline Trail Amateur Boxing Club in Kentville, Nova Scotia (his hometown). He has coached a variety of amateur boxers including some amateur national champions and a gold medallist at the most recent Canada Games. He is also a bus driver for the Annapolis Valley Regional School Board in Nova Scotia, Canada.

1976 Olympic record
Below are the results of Bryan Gibson, a Canadian middleweight boxer who competed at the 1976 Montreal Olympics:

 Round of 32: lost to Bernd Wittenburg (East Germany) by a third-round knockout

References
 Canadian Olympic Committee

1947 births
Living people
People from Kentville, Nova Scotia
Black Canadian boxers
Sportspeople from Nova Scotia
Boxers at the 1976 Summer Olympics
Olympic boxers of Canada
Middleweight boxers
Canadian male boxers
Black Nova Scotians